The Davenport BD-2 Nuggit (sic)  is an American biplane developed for homebuilt construction.

Design and development
The B-2 Nuggit is a single place biplane with conventional landing gear. The cockpit is covered with a sliding bubble canopy. The fuselage is welded steel construction with aircraft fabric covering. A round cowling covers the engine to appear like a radial engine installation. The wing uses a wooden spar with aluminum wing ribs.

Specifications (BD-2 Nuggit)

References

Homebuilt aircraft